Lejsek (Czech feminine: Lejsková) is a Czech surname. Notable people with the surname include:

 Michael Lejsek (born 1998), Czech luger
 Vlastimil Lejsek (1927–2010), Czech composer and pianist

Czech-language surnames